Ladislav Hecht (August 31, 1909 – May 27, 2004) was a Jewish Czechoslovak-American professional tennis player. He won the gold medal in singles at the 1932 Maccabiah Games in Mandatory Palestine, and won the 1934 Hungarian International Tennis Singles Championship. In 1937 he reached the semifinals of the doubles at Wimbledon with Roderich Menzel, and the following year he reached the 1938 Wimbledon quarterfinals in singles.  Despite being Jewish, he was invited to the Germany Davis Cup team in 1938 by an aide to Adolph Hitler who was not aware that he was Jewish, but chose not to accept the invitation. He represented Czechoslovakia in the Davis Cup during the 1930s, was captain of the team, and had a record of 18-19. In the 1930s, he was ranked world #6 in singles.

Early life
Hecht was born in Zsolna, Kingdom of Hungary (today Žilina, Slovakia), on the border between Slovakia and Hungary, and was Jewish.

Tennis career; interrupted by World War II

Europe
He began to learn tennis at age 11, and in 1931 he moved to Prague for better training conditions.

Hecht developed a successful tennis career, many considering him to be the best tennis player in Europe immediately before the Second World War.

In the 1930s, he was ranked world #6 in singles.

He won the gold medal in singles at the 1932 Maccabiah Games in Mandatory Palestine.

In 1934, Hecht won the Butler Trophy of Monte Carlo alongside Roderich Menzel, defeating Jacques Brugnon and Jean Lesueur in the final. In singles, he was victorious at the Hungarian International Tennis Championships, upsetting Henner Henkel of Germany in the semifinal and Ignacy Tłoczyński of Poland in the final. He reached the doubles finals with Josef Caska.

In late 1935 and early 1936, Hecht and Menzel toured the Far East, which included a visit to Japan to participate in the Japanese National Championships, where Menzel lost in the final, and they lost in the doubles final as well, both times to title defender Jiro Yamagishi. From there, they sailed to India where they were the finalists at the East of India Championships. Arriving home, he was defeated in the Czechoslovakian International Championship match by British player Fred Perry. He was a second straight time finalist in Budapest.

In 1937 he reached the semifinals of the doubles at Wimbledon with Menzel, and the following year he reached the 1938 Wimbledon quarterfinals in singles.

From 1930 to 1939, he played for the Czech Republic Davis Cup team, achieving a record of 18–19, and was its captain. In 1936, Hecht moved to Budapest, and then sought livelihood in Australia.

Hecht was invited to play for the German Davis Cup Team in 1938 after Germany acquired part of Czechoslovakia by an aide to Adolph Hitler who was unaware that he was Jewish, but he declined.

United States
He fled to the United States three days before the Nazi Germany invaded the Czech Lands in 1939, and became an American citizen. He worked in a munitions factory in New Jersey during World War II.

After the war, Hecht continued his tennis career, becoming a no. 1 ranked player in the eastern United States. In May 1941, he was the runner-up at the Brooklyn Tennis Tournament, losing to Pancho Segura. At the end of 1942 he was ranked # 10 of all men players in the United States.

In 1947, he won the Brooklyn Tennis Tournament at 38 years of age by beating Peruvian Enrique Buse in the final in straight sets. Hecht added the Eastern Clay Court Championships to his accolades the same year by defeating American Dick Savitt in the final in Jackson Heights, Queens.

In 1957, the USTA ranked him second in the country in senior singles, behind Bryan Grant.

Honors
Hecht was inducted into the International Jewish Sports Hall of Fame in 2005. In 2007 he was inducted into the Hall of Fame of Slovak Tennis.

Later life
Hecht started toy and paintbrush businesses, and later in life lived in Queens, New York. Later in life was honored by the city of Bratislava, having a multisport stadium named after him in 1966.

He had two children, Timothy and Andrew, both of whom settled in Aspen, Colorado.

See also
List of select Jewish tennis players

References

Works cited

Online media

Books

Periodicals

External links
 
 
 

1909 births
2004 deaths
American male tennis players
American people of Hungarian-Jewish descent
Czechoslovak emigrants to the United States
Czechoslovak Jews
Czechoslovak male tennis players
Hungarian Jews
Jewish American sportspeople
Jewish tennis players
Sportspeople from Queens, New York
Sportspeople from Žilina
Jews who emigrated to escape Nazism
Tennis people from New York (state)
Maccabiah Games gold medalists
Maccabiah Games medalists in tennis
Maccabiah Games competitors by country
Competitors at the 1932 Maccabiah Games
International Jewish Sports Hall of Fame inductees
20th-century American Jews
21st-century American Jews